Roger Wolfe Kahn (October 19, 1907 – July 12, 1962) was an American jazz and popular musician, composer, bandleader (Roger Wolfe Kahn and His Orchestra) and an aviator.

Life and career
Roger Wolfe Kahn (originally spelled "Wolff") was born in Morristown, New Jersey, into a wealthy German Jewish banking family. His parents were Adelaide "Addie" (Wolff) and Otto Hermann Kahn, a famous banker and patron of the arts. His maternal grandfather was banker Abraham Wolff. Otto and Roger Kahn were the first father and son to appear separately on the cover of Time magazine: Otto in November 1925 and Roger in September 1927, aged 19.

On 16 August 1926, Time magazine wrote: "If it is strange that Otto Hermann Kahn, sensitive patron of high art in Manhattan, should have a saxophone-tooting, banjo-plunking, clarinet-wailing, violin-jazzing son, it is stranger still that that son, Roger Wolfe Kahn, has become a truly outstanding jazzer at the perilous age of 18. Roger's ten orchestras, one of which he leads, have netted him some $30,000".

Kahn began studying the violin aged six and is said to have learned to play eighteen musical instruments before starting to lead his own orchestra in 1923, aged only 16. At the age of ten, Kahn had bought a ukulele in a Ditson Music Shop in Manhattan together with special-priced instruction on how to play; such was his keen interest in music. The ukulele lured him away from his studies at St. Bernard's School and turned his mind toward violins, pianos, banjos and jazz orchestras. At St. Bernard's he took no more interest in athletics than he did in studies or in social activities. By the age of sixteen, he’d rejected studying at college. Instead, he formed his own booking agency and organized a paying band and installed it at the Knickerbocker Grill in New York. He could play every instrument in the outfit, all self-taught, and his favorite instruments to play were the piano and saxophone. By the time he reached nineteen, he had eleven orchestras on his books that played in resorts and hotels from Newport, Rhode Island to Florida. They’d netted him personally an average of $50,000 a year for the four years of their existence. His success enabled him to pursue his passion for composing music and aviation.

In 1925, Kahn appeared in a short film made in Lee De Forest's Phonofilm sound-on-film process. Kahn hired many famous jazz musicians and singers of the day to play and sing in his band, especially during recording sessions (e.g.) Tommy Dorsey, Morton Downey, Joe Venuti, Eddie Lang, Artie Shaw, Jack Teagarden, Red Nichols, Libby Holman, Gertrude Niesen, Franklyn Baur, Dick Robertson, Elmer Feldkamp and Gene Krupa. Early on in his career Kahn made several recordings under the name Roger Wolfe Kahn and His Hotel Biltmore Orchestra. It was during September, 1925, that Joe Venuti joined the Kahn Orchestra during their residency at the New York Biltmore Hotel.

On 15 December 1925, Kahn and his Orchestra recorded four takes of the song Rhythm Of The Day for Victor Records and for some reason Victor chose not to release any of them. Undeterred, Kahn wrote the song Following You Around, which made him money and George Whiteman went on to arrange the score of Kahn’s stage musical Rhapsurdity. Another musical comedy Kahn wrote, (a satire on musical comedy) called Hearts and Flowers, was produced by Horace Liveright.

He made recordings for:
 Victor 1925–29,
 Brunswick 1929–30,
 Columbia in 1932.

In February 1926, Kahn's recording of I'm Sitting On Top Of The World charted at #9. It was reported in Variety, (September 29, 1926); "Roger Wolfe Kahn and his original Victor orchestra of eleven are getting $4200 for five and a half days booking commencing October 4 at the New Orpheum Palace, Chicago, which Kahn's band will headline at the opening attraction. The Kahn outfit returns to the Albee, Brooklyn, NY followed by the Palace Theatre, New York, following which they commence rehearsals for their new cafe, Le Perroquet de Paris, scheduled for opening in November".

Kahn fronted several fashionable night clubs in New York. One of his own clubs, Le Perroquet de Paris, opened in New York in November 1926 with a five-dollar cover charge. On 16 August 1926, Time magazine wrote: "Last week, Roger announced his purchase of Giro's (night club) in Manhattan; his partner is Rene Racover of the Perroquet in Paris (France); his resort's new name is Perroquet de Paris." Kahn spent $250,000 of his father’s money on decorating the club and installing a silver stage proscenium. The club had a mirrored dance floor and aquariums beneath the individual tables and Kahn made a point of following the Parisian example of giving expensive souvenirs to the women that visited his clubs. At Le Perroquet de Paris he gave each female guest a bottle of premier perfume. Variety magazine reported Le Perroquet de Paris to be, "the last gasp in smart night clubs. Ultra artistic with an ultra 'In following' (with) the millionaire maestro's own crack dance band. Be sure to make it. $5 couvert."

In 1927, Kahn produced two Vitaphone film shorts called Night Club. One short featured an act called the Williams Sisters (a singing/dancing duo). Both shorts were filmed on February 14, 1927 at the Manhattan Opera House on 315 West 34th Street in New York, and the Williams Sisters were featured in the short numbered Vitaphone #469 as 'signing and dancing youngsters' performing a number titled "Thinking of You." The Vitaphone film was an early attempt at sound movies which used both film and disk for sound. A reviewer in the San Antonio Express, April 10, 1927 wrote: "Roger Wolfe Kahn's specialty on the Vitaphone is undoubtedly the best subject offered since the installation of the devise. His instrumental harmony is wonderful and original... and the Williams Sisters act brings the act above par for any circuit." A copy of the sound disk supposedly exits at the Library of Congress in Washington, but the film elements are missing and presumed lost.

In some respect, due to his father's prominence, Kahn’s imagined Gatsbyesque lifestyle made him a regular feature of gossip columns, although in reality he was carefully unobtrusive and shied away from company. Were it not for his precipitous enthusiasms and precocious successes he may well have attracted little more than statistical notice. Unlike his younger days when he took little interest in fashion, by the time he’d reached twenty, as an eligible bachelor he’d grown more debonair. During one trip to Europe in 1927, he returned to New York City with fifty new tailored-suits and untold neckties, shoes and hats. It was even reported in the press that during the trip he’d become engaged to marry a Miss Virginia Franck (a professional dancer), which turned out to be an untruth.

During 1927, Kahn hired Hannah Williams from the Williams Sisters to dance in a revue at his New York Night Club, Le Perroquet de Paris. It was during her engagement at the club that she popularised the song, "Hard Hearted Hannah (The Vamp of Savannah)".

In 1928, Kahn co-wrote the jazz standard "Crazy Rhythm" with Irving Caesar and Joseph Meyer for the Broadway musical Here's Howe.

Kahn always had fun leading and conducting his orchestra. Reportedly, when the band was playing especially well he used to throw himself onto the floor and wave his legs in the air.
However, the passion Kahn had for music was usurped by his deeper passion for flying and it was during his many trips accompanying his parents to Europe that Kahn developed his aviation skills. During one trip to France he chartered his own plane in Paris and flew it to London. Unlike the transatlantic hero, Charles Lindbergh, who after his triumphant arrival in Paris was to cross the English Channel by air the same day and had to postpone the flight on account of a heavy fog, Kahn flew anyway.
As well as owning a string of expensive motor vehicles and a speedboat, Kahn went on to purchase a stunt airplane, which he flew to compete in transcontinental races. Kahn’s love of ‘speed’ became an ongoing worry for his parents.

Aviation career
On March 29, 1934, Kahn’s father, Otto Hermann Kahn died. Doubtless, his father’s sudden and unexpected death played a major role in Kahn reassessing his own life and career. Kahn's interest in aviation was no secret; he was already a member of the Advisory Board for the American Society for the Promotion of Aviation. He joined as early as 1928  and in 1933, Kahn had become a test pilot for Grumman Aircraft Engineering Corporation on Long Island, a well-known aircraft manufacturer.
Kahn would later excel in the role of managing the technical service and sales division of Grumman Aircraft Engineering Corporation and Grumman built a special sales aircraft, known as a G-58B (a modified F8F Bearcat fighter plane), in which he toured numerous military bases across North America during his career with the company. In 1943, Kahn was chairman of the Institute of Aeronautical Sciences and later became its vice-president . In 1956, Kahn became a member of the Laura Taber Barbour Air Safety Award Board (LTBASAB). Kahn also became chairman of the National Aeronautic Association (NAA).

The Kahn Orchestra 1938 one-off reunion concert
In 1938, the Kahn Orchestra reformed to perform a special one-off concert, in what could possibly have been the Kahn Orchestra’s last ever concert. The show was held in honor of the unveiling of the enormous Golden Age Aviation Mural installed at Roosevelt Field Airport: the mural was painted by the artist Aline Rhonie Hofheimer (a pilot in her own right) who had  been commissioned to paint a fresco mural on the north brick wall of Roosevelt Field Hangar F. The mural commemorated the history of aviation from 1908 to 1927 ending with Charles Lindbergh's trans-Atlantic flight. After Rhonie's mural was completed, there was an artist's reception and party held at Roosevelt Field Airport on October 15, 1938. The invitation’s read, ‘You are invited to attend a party and barn dance given in honor of Aline Rhonie commemorating her achievement in the completion of the world’s largest aviation fresco depicting the history of aviation.’ It was at this reception that ‘"A" Roger Wolfe Kahn Orchestra’ performed. "A" Roger Wolfe Kahn Orchestra might have meant a tribute-type band, or it may have been that Rhonie was able to use her pilot network to coax Kahn to reform a band to perform during this special occasion. The party ran from ten in the evening until dawn. The New York Times on October 17, 1938 reported, 'The fresco was unveiled at a party on Saturday night, attended by more than 500 guests. This all-night party, with informal dress, was probably THE event for October at Roosevelt Field.' It doesn't mention in the report whether Kahn himself fronted the orchestra.

Discography

Hot Hot Hottentot
Mountain Greenery
One Night In the Jungle
Nobody Loves Me
Following You Around 
One Summer Night
Cross Your Heart 
Sometimes I'm Happy
I'm Sitting on Top of the World
Jersey Walk
Tell Me Tonight
Tonight You Belong to Me
A Cup of Coffee, a Sandwich and You
I Can't Believe That You're in Love with Me
Anything You Say
Crazy Rhythm (later used in Woody Allen's film Bullets Over Broadway (1994))
Imagination
Liza
Russian Lullaby
She's a Great Great Girl (the closing theme song of WAMU's Hot Jazz Saturday Night hosted by Rob Bamberger)  Also notable for the lengthy early solo by Jack Teagarden.
A Shine On Your Shoes
 Lazy Day
It Don't Mean a Thing (If It Ain't Got That Swing)
My Silent Love

Broadway shows
Vogues (1924) - revue
Here's Howe (1928) – musical – co-composer
Americana (1928) – revue – composer
9:15 Revue (11 February 1930) – revue - (Cohan Theatre, N. Y.) (contributing composer)

Filmography
The Yacht Party - (1932) Directed by Roy Mack – cast: Roger Wolfe Kahn, Gertrude Niesen, Melissa Mason (contortionist), Eaton Boys, Chauncey Morehouse (drums), Artie Shaw (clarinet). The film is shot on board a yacht and includes Kahn and his Orchestra playing "Way Down Yonder in New Orleans", "Dinah" and "Lullaby of the Leaves". Footage towards the end of the film shows an aeroplane flying overhead performing stunts. It was rumoured that Roger Wolfe Kahn flew the plane that performed the stunts.

The Kahn Family
Roger Wolfe Kahn was born in Morristown, New Jersey, into a family surrounded by wealth, art and artistic people. He had one elder brother, Gilbert, and two elder sisters, Maude and Margaret Dorothy. It was at Morristown that the children grew up and where their days were carefully scheduled and regulated by their mother Adelaide Wolff Kahn. During week days the children followed a scheduled program of lessons interspersed with play. At the weekends, the routine was shattered with the arrival of their father, Otto Kahn, from New York. For when he was near his children, he was irrepressible and would constantly divert them and give them his undivided attention. Otto Kahn's wisdom in life was to "Live life. Love beauty. Be happy," and as such, young Kahn grew up with encouragement from his parents to pursue his dreams. When Kahn was five, he and his family moved from New Jersey to live in London  where they resided for two years at St Dunstan's House in Regent's Park; this was rebuilt as Winfield House in the 1930s and is now the American Ambassador's residence. The house had the largest private garden in London second only to the garden at Buckingham Palace. The constant travelling Kahn experienced during his childhood accompanying his parents to Europe gave Kahn and his brother and sisters a broader education than most children would have received. Kahn's passion for aviation grew from these frequent trips abroad.

In 1931, Kahn made headlines on the New York society pages when he married Broadway musical comedy actress Hannah Williams on January 16, 1931. The wedding was held at Oheka Castle, his family's country estate on Long Island, and the marriage was kept secret from the public for two weeks, until the Broadway show Williams was appearing in, Sweet and Low, had had its final performances. The American public took the newlyweds to their hearts and Kahn referred to his wife as the "Cheerful Little Earful", after the song of the same name which his wife had sung on Broadway. The marriage did not last and the couple made headlines again when they divorced two years later and when, after only a few weeks, Williams married boxing champion Jack Dempsey. Three days after the divorce, on April 7, 1933, Roger Wolfe Kahn married Edith May Nelson, a Maine politician's daughter and they lived on Muttontown Road, Syosset, Long Island. Their marriage lasted until Kahn's death of a heart attack in New York City on July 12, 1962. By his second wife, he had two children, Peter W. Kahn and Dacia W. Kahn.

In popular culture
In the 1979 film The Jerk, listening to a version of Kahn's song Crazy Rhythm on the radio inspires Steve Martin's character to hitchhike to St. Louis, setting in motion his rise, fall, and eventual reunion with his adopted family.

Roger Wolfe Kahn and his Orchestra have four song entries in the ‘Top 1000 instrumentals of all time’, no. 360 - "Mountain Greenery", no. 782 - "A Little Bungalow", no. 823 - "Clap Yo' Hands", and at no. 889 - "I'm Sitting on Top of the World".

Two of Roger Wolfe Kahn's songs, "Into My Heart" and "Exactly Like You", were sampled by The Caretaker for his final project, "Everywhere at the end of time".

Further reading  
 Williams, Iain Cameron. The KAHNS of Fifth Avenue: the Crazy Rhythm of Otto Hermann Kahn and the Kahn Family, 2022, iwp publishing,  - the book covers extensively Roger's music and aviation career.
 Was Roger Wolfe Kahn America’s first popular music teen idol?

References

External links

Roger Wolfe Kahn and Otto H. Kahn
Roger Wolfe Kahn recordings at the Discography of American Historical Recordings.
Roger Wolfe Kahn and his Orchestra Red Hot Jazz Archive
The KAHNS of Fifth Avenue website and blog exploring the lives of Otto Hermann Kahn and the Kahn family including Roger Wolfe Kahn, with rare photographs of Roger and his Orchestra.

1907 births
1962 deaths
Jewish American jazz composers
American jazz bandleaders
American jazz composers
American male jazz composers
People from Morristown, New Jersey
20th-century American composers
Victor Records artists
Big band bandleaders
Columbia Records artists
Brunswick Records artists
People from Long Island
Impresarios
American people of German-Jewish descent
Aviators from New Jersey
Aviation history of the United States
Aviation pioneers
St. Bernard's School alumni
Jewish jazz musicians
Jazz musicians from New York (state)
20th-century American male musicians
20th-century jazz composers
20th-century American Jews